The Corporation of Trinity House of Deptford Strond, also known as Trinity House (and formally as The Master, Wardens and Assistants of the Guild Fraternity or Brotherhood of the most glorious and undivided Trinity and of St Clement in the Parish of Deptford Strond in the County of Kent), is the official authority for lighthouses in England, Wales, the Channel Islands and Gibraltar. Trinity House is also responsible for the provision and maintenance of other navigational aids, such as lightvessels, buoys, and maritime radio/satellite communication systems. It is also an official deep sea pilotage authority, providing expert navigators for ships trading in Northern European waters.

Trinity House is also a maritime charity, disbursing funds for the welfare of retired seamen, the training of young cadets and the promotion of safety at sea; for the financial year ending in March 2013 it spent approximately £6.5 million in furtherance of its charitable objectives.

Funding for the work of the lighthouse service comes from "light dues" levied on commercial vessels calling at ports in the British Isles, based on the net registered tonnage of the vessel. The rate is set by the Department for Transport, and annually reviewed. Funding for the maritime charity is generated separately.

The corporation was founded in 1514. Its first master was Thomas Spert (later Sir), sailing master of Henry VIII's flagship Mary Rose and of Henry Grace à Dieu.

Master of the Corporation

The Master of the Corporation (now an honorary title) is Anne, Princess Royal. Previous Masters of Trinity House have included Prince Philip, Duke of Edinburgh; Vice-Admiral of England Thomas Spert, master of the warship Henry Grace à Dieu under Henry VIII; the diarist Samuel Pepys; William Pitt the Younger; Field Marshal the Duke of Wellington; and Admiral William Penn (father of William Penn, founder of Pennsylvania).

Other prominent individuals in Britain, often connected with commercial shipping or the Admiralty, have been associated with Trinity House, including Winston Churchill. He gained his status as an Elder Brother of Trinity House as a result of his position as First Lord of the Admiralty before and during the First World War.  Often, especially on naval-related forays during the Second World War, Churchill was seen in the Trinity House cap or uniform. Churchill also had a Trinity House vessel (THV) named after him, THV Winston Churchill.

Governance

Trinity House is ruled by a court of thirty-one Elder Brethren, presided over by a Master. These are appointed from 300 Younger Brethren who act as advisors and perform other duties as needed. The Younger Brethren are appointed from lay people with maritime experience, mainly naval officers and ships' masters, but also harbourmasters, pilots, yachtsmen, and anyone with useful experience.

Headquarters of the Corporation
The headquarters of the corporation is the present Trinity House, which was designed by architect Samuel Wyatt and built in 1796. It has a suite of five state rooms with views over Trinity Square, the Tower of London and the River Thames.

History
The Corporation came into being in 1514 by Royal Charter granted by Henry VIII under the name "The Master, Wardens, and Assistants of the Guild, Fraternity, or Brotherhood of the most glorious and undivided Trinity, and of St. Clement in the Parish of Deptford-Strond in the County of Kent." 
The charter came as a result of a petition put forward on 19 March 1513 by a guild of Deptford-based mariners. They were troubled by the poor conduct of unregulated pilots on the Thames and asked the king for licence to regulate pilotage. The first Master was Thomas Spert (later Sir), sailing master of Henry's flagship Mary Rose and the Henry Grace à Dieu. The name of the guild derives from the Holy Trinity and St. Clement, the patron saint of mariners.

As John Whormby, a Clerk to the Corporation, wrote in 1746, their general business was:

In 1566, Elizabeth I's Seamarks Act enabled Trinity House:

With the increasing number of ships lost along the Newcastle to London coal route, Trinity House established the Lowestoft Lighthouse in 1609, a pair of wooden towers with candle illuminants. Until the late 18th century, candle, coal, or wood fires were used as lighthouse illuminants, improved in 1782 with the circular-wick oil-burning Argand lamp, the first ‘catoptric’ mirrored reflector in 1777, and Fresnel’s ‘dioptric’ lens system in 1823. The Nore lightship was established as the world's first floating light in 1732.

Trinity House took over the management of all public buoys in the kingdom in 1594 from the Lord High Admiral. A warrant, dated 11 June 1594, granted to the corporation the right of, 
By 1847, revenue collected from this source was £11,000 to £12,000 per year.

In 1836, Trinity House accepted powers to levy out the last private lighthouse owners and began refurbishing and upgrading its lighthouse estate.

In 1803, the Corporation established the Blackwall Depot as a buoy workshop, and six district depots were later established at Harwich, Great Yarmouth, East Cowes, Penzance, Holyhead and Swansea. In December 2002, Trinity House announced that the Great Yarmouth, Penzance and East Cowes depots would close. Today, Trinity House's operational headquarters is in Harwich, supported by depots in Swansea and a flight operations base at St Just in Cornwall. Its operations are also supported by three vessels; the two large tenders THV Patricia and THV Galatea, and the Rapid Intervention Vessel THV Alert. A small secretariat is based at Tower Hill.

During the First World War, the Corporation served a number of functions: it buoyed shipping lanes and naval operations, moved lightvessels, and laid hundreds of buoys. During the Second World War, Trinity House kept sea lanes marked and lighted for Allied convoys. The Pilotage Service guided ships to their ports under hazardous conditions; at the time of the Dunkirk evacuation, a number of pilots helped in piloting vessels to and from the beaches.

On the night of 29 December 1940, Trinity House was destroyed by the most severe of the air attacks on London; the interiors were completely gutted and many archives and treasures were lost. (The restored house was reopened by Elizabeth II on 21 October 1953.)

In preparation for the D-Day landings on 6 June 1944, Trinity House laid 73 lighted buoys and two lightvessels to indicate a safe route for landing craft. Trinity House pilots were responsible for all commercial vessels involved and many of the service vessels. In the month following D-Day, nearly 3,000 vessels were handled by 88 river pilots and nearly 2,000 ships by 115 sea pilots working day and night.

In 1969, Trinity House initiated the debut of helicopter reliefs to and from offshore lighthouses, succeeding the boat reliefs. These had been susceptible to being delayed by months during inclement weather. Trinity House played a major part in the design of the IALA Maritime Buoyage System, laying the first buoy off Dover, watched over by representatives of 16 nations on 15 April 1977.

By the 1960s, Trinity House licensed about 500 pilots, of whom about 350 were in the London District, handling an estimated 60% of the nation's piloted tonnage. The 1987 Pilotage Act authorized Trinity House to pass its District Pilotage responsibilities to various local harbour authorities, becoming instead a licensing authority for deep sea pilotage.

The completion of the lighthouse automation programme came with a ceremony held at the North Foreland Lighthouse on 26 November 1998, attended by the last six keepers and Master, the Duke of Edinburgh. On 9 June 1989, the last manned lightvessel was towed from the Channel lightvessel station to Harwich.

As a charitable body, the Corporation has owned a number of properties for benevolent purposes, chief among them the estate at Newington in south London (now rebranded as Trinity Village) and almshouses at Deptford, Mile End, and Walmer; the last of these estates was built in 1958 and is in use by the corporation today.

In 2011, the Princess Royal succeeded the Duke of Edinburgh as Master. She was aboard Trinity House Motor Boat No.1 during the Diamond Jubilee procession.

In 2014, the Royal Mint issued a two pound coin commemorating the 500th anniversary of the granting of Trinity House's Royal Charter.

Trinity High Water

Trinity High Water (or High Water, Trinity Standard), abbreviated T.H.W., was a vertical datum used for legal purposes in the River Thames and informally over a much wider area.  Though not thus defined, it was about 12 feet 6 inches above mean sea level.

The concept had its origin in the London Dock Act 1800 which authorised the making of the Wapping basin of the London Docks and specified its minimum depth i.e. over the sill.  At that time there was no Ordnance Datum or other accepted vertical benchmark.  Therefore, the 1800 Act defined the benchmark for this dock as "the level of the river at low-water mark".  Since opinions about this might vary, it added 

Accordingly. Trinity House — in the person of Captain Joseph Huddart — set a stone in the external wing wall of the Hermitage entrance to the London Docks. It was inscribed  Similar stones were afterwards set for Wapping and Shadwell entrances.

This established a benchmark which was supposedly extended for further purposes e.g. the sill heights of other docks and for high water also.

Trinity High Water Mark was much used as a datum in London for legal purposes.  It was required to be marked on all drawings of property adjacent to the river when submitted to the Thames Conservancy.  As another example, the minimum height of river walls were specified in feet and inches above T.H.W.  The benchmark was used in other contexts, such as "Luton is 400 feet above Trinity high-water"; the elevations of water reservoirs; depths in the Geological Survey (London Basin); the depth of an archaeological find; and for railway elevations.

Despite the importance of the Trinity Standard benchmark for legal purposes, it appears that there were discrepancies, some of them grave. Inconsistent standards purporting to be T.H.W. existed.  Some stones set by Captain Huddart afterwards could not be found.

Eventually, it was deemed by the Port of London Act 1968 to be a level having a value of 11.4 feet (3.475 metres) above Ordnance Datum Newlyn. and thus the connection with the Trinity House marker stones was abandoned.

Nautical assessors
In legal cases involving issues of navigation or seamanship e.g. collisions at sea, Elder Brethren  of Trinity House act as expert nautical advisers to the Admiralty Court in London.  Usually, two Elder Brethren sit with the Admiralty judge.  Their function is not to decide the case themselves, but to advise the presiding judge about the practicalities of seamanship and ship handling.  When this happens, the parties are not allowed to produce expert witnesses of their own without a special reason, since the court considers itself to be well enough advised already.  But if one of the colliding ships was a Trinity House vessel, Elder Brethren cannot be employed. Elder Brethren may perform the same functions in appeals.

In a 2020 case about a multiple ship collision in the Suez Canal the Admiralty judge wrote a 306-paragraph judgment ending thus:

Operational responsibilities and role of the corporation

Trinity House has three main functions:
It is the General Lighthouse Authority for England, Wales, the Channel Islands and Gibraltar, responsible for a range of general aids to navigation, 'signs of the sea', from lighthouses to radar beacons.
It is a charitable organisation dedicated to the safety, welfare and training of mariners.
It is a Deep Sea Pilotage Authority, licensing expert navigators to act as deep sea pilots for ships trading in Northern European waters.

The Corporation also inspects buoys provided by local harbour authorities. It no longer provides local pilots for entering ports. Contrary to popular belief, Trinity House is not (and never has been) part of HM Coastguard, although it does work closely with the Maritime and Coastguard Agency.

Trinity House's activities as a lighthouse authority are financed from "light dues" levied on commercial shipping calling at ports in the United Kingdom.

Assets

Lighthouses in England
Lightvessels in the United Kingdom

Lighthouses
Trinity House maintains 65 lighthouses ranging from isolated rock towers like the Eddystone to mainland towers like Southwold lighthouse.

All Trinity House lighthouses have been automated since November 1998, when the UK's last manned lighthouse, North Foreland in Kent, was converted to automatic operation. Lighthouse automation began as long ago as 1910, thanks to an invention of Gustaf Dalén. His sun valve was fitted in a number of lighthouses powered by acetylene gas. The vital component was a black metal rod, which was suspended vertically and connected to the gas supply. As it absorbed the sun's heat, the rod expanded downwards, cutting off the gas during the day.

Automation in the modern context began in the early 1980s, made possible firstly by the construction of lantern-top helipads at remote rock lighthouses, to enable the rapid transfer of technicians to a lighthouse in the event of a breakdown, and secondly, by the development of remote control technology, which enables all lighthouses and lightvessels to be monitored and controlled from the Trinity House Operations and Planning Centre, in Harwich, Essex.

The other General Lighthouse Authorities in other parts of the British Isles:
Commissioners of Irish Lights — Ireland (Northern Ireland and Republic of Ireland)
Northern Lighthouse Board (formerly known as Commissioners for Northern Lights) — Scotland and the Isle of Man

Vessels

Ships

Trinity House vessels have the ship prefix THV.  three such vessels operate around the coast of England, Wales and the Channel Islands.
THV Patricia (1982) is an 86.3m Multi Functional Tender that carries out maintenance work on navigation aids, towing, wreck location and marking. She has a helicopter-landing pad, a 20-tonne main crane and 28-tonne bollard pull and towing winch.
THV Alert (2006) is a 39.3 m Rapid Intervention Vessel, able to respond rapidly to maritime incidents  on the southeast coast of England. She is capable of buoy handling, wreck marking and towing. Fitted with multibeam and side scan hydrographic surveying capability and DP1 dynamic positioning, Alert can be utilised as a research platform with a large working deck.
THV Galatea (2007) is an 84m Multi Functional Tender with a helicopter-landing pad. Fitted with a range of high specification survey equipment and a 30-tonne capacity crane, azimuthing propellers, two 750 kW bow thrusters and DP2 dynamic positioning, Galatea replaced the 1987-built THV Mermaid.

Boats
Trinity House operates a number of small boats, mostly functioning as ship's tenders to the vessels in the section above. The historic right of Trinity House to escort the sovereign when travelling by ship in territorial waters is still exercised on ceremonial occasions. On the River Thames and inland waterways the duty is carried out by the vessel designated Trinity House No 1 Boat, a name which designates any boat assigned to this duty;  a tender of THV Galatea is used for such ceremonial duties. However, for the Thames Diamond Jubilee Pageant on 3 June 2012, this boat had the name "T.H. No 1 Boat" painted onto the bow (left and right sides) whilst carrying the Master (the Princess Royal) in the jubilee flotilla. On 8 November 2014, Trinity House entered a float into the annual Lord Mayor's Show in the City of London, consisting of a heavy low-loader lorry, with the Trinity House No 1 Boat mounted on the low-loader trailer as an exhibit.

Property
In addition to the maritime assets, the Corporation of Trinity House also owns two listed estates: one of predominantly residential buildings at Trinity Village in Borough, London; and a working farm at Goxhill, Lincolnshire. The rents from these properties form a substantial part of the corporation's income.

Other assets
Amongst other significant assets, Trinity House operates a helicopter capable of landing on lighthouse and ship landing pads. From May 2011 to November 2015, the aircraft in principal use was an MD Helicopters MD Explorer 902 owned by Police Aviation Services (PAS) and operated under lease. Since December 2015 a Eurocopter EC135 G-GLAA owned and operated by PDG Aviation Services has fulfilled the role.

Ensign
The Ensign of Trinity House is a British Red Ensign defaced with the shield of the coat of arms (a St George's Cross with a sailing ship in each quarter). The Master and Deputy Master each have their own flags.

When escorting the sovereign, Trinity House vessels may fly the White Ensign.

See also
Her Majesty's Coastguard
Northern Lighthouse Board
Commissioners of Irish Lights
IALA – The International Association of Lighthouse Authorities
List of oldest companies
Two other institutions, with a similar history and longevity, are licensed for the examination and licensing of deep-sea pilots in England:
Hull Trinity House
Newcastle-upon-Tyne Trinity House 
Trinity House National Lighthouse Museum
National Coastwatch Institution voluntary organisation coverering England and Wales
Lightvessels in the United Kingdom

Notes

References
The Corporation of the Hull Trinity House, established 1369.
The Newcastle Trinity House.
europilots.org.uk 
"A fortnight in Egypt at the opening of the Suez Canal," London : Smith and Ebbs, 1869. Written by Captain Sir Frederick Arrow [Deputy Master of Trinity House]

External links

Trinity House official website
Photos of vessels
English Lightships
International Association of Lighthouse Authorities
History of Trinity House
1685 Royal Charter of Trinity House
Trinity Hospital, Mile End – Survey of London, Monograph 1
James Alexander Riach, The Captain's Log: From Conway and Clan Line to Trinity House. With an Introduction by Glen Murray and Afterword by Alan Riach (The Grimsay Press, 2013).

 
1514 establishments in England
Grade I listed buildings in the City of London
Department for Transport
Lighthouse organizations
National government buildings in London
Non-departmental public bodies of the United Kingdom government
Organisations based in the City of London
Water transport in England
Water transport in Wales